Ganneruvaram is a mandal in Karimnagar District, Telangana.

Villages in Karimnagar district